Thirumanur is a village in the Ariyalur taluk of Ariyalur district, Tamil Nadu, India.

Demographics 

 census, Thirumanur had a total population of 6389 with 3184 males and 3196 females.

References 

Villages in Ariyalur district